Sir John Charles Hermon  (23 November 1928 – 6 November 2008) was the Chief Constable of the Royal Ulster Constabulary from 1980 to 1989.

Early life
'Jack' Hermon was born in Castletown, Islandmagee, County Antrim, to William Rowan Hermon, a building contractor, and his wife, Agnes. He had a grammar school education and gave up an early career in accountancy to join the Royal Ulster Constabulary in 1950.

Career
After joining the RUC, he was posted in various parts of western Northern Ireland, including Eglinton, Coalisland and Strabane, before sitting his sergeant's examinations. He was the first RUC officer to attend the advanced policing course at the British police training college in Bramshill in England in 1963.

He became Chief Constable in 1980, after an attachment to Scotland Yard. As Chief Constable, he changed the interview processes of terrorist suspects at the Castlereagh interrogation centre. An anonymous former interrogator has claimed that "The new chief constable was completely against any mistreatment of prisoners whatsoever...we started to detect a change .... straight away." Hermon is thought to have believed that the allegations of mistreatment were harming relations between the RUC and the wider communities. He retired in 1989, and became the longest-serving Chief Constable of the RUC.

One analysis has argued that Hermon's actions in charge of the RUC 'transformed it into a more independent force, shorn of its worst sectarian sympathies' and that these reforms also had the effect of allowing the RUC to be better able to support the peace process in the 1990s than it would have been otherwise. After retiring, he became, in June 1989, a consultant to a private security company.

Marriages
He married Jean Webb in 1954, and had a son and a daughter before she died of cancer in 1986. In 1987 he met Sylvia Paisley who had written an academic paper critical of Hermon's conduct in an employment case brought by female RUC officers. They married and had two sons. After his death, his widow, Lady Hermon, was, from 2005 to 2010, the sole Ulster Unionist Party (UUP) Member of Parliament. From 2010 she was re-elected as an independent, with an increased majority. She held the North Down seat from 2001 to 2019.

Politics
In 1998, Hermon campaigned for a yes vote during the Good Friday Agreement referendum.

Death
Hermon suffered from Alzheimer's disease from at least 2004 until his death on 6 November 2008, a few weeks before his 80th birthday. He died in a nursing home in Bangor.

Honours
Hermon was appointed Officer of the Order of the British Empire (OBE) in the 1975 Birthday Honours. He was knighted in the 1982 New Year Honours and received the Queen's Police Medal in the 1988 Birthday Honours.

Publications
 Holding the Line (1997 autobiography)

References

External links
"Former RUC chief moved out of nursing home after terror alert"

1928 births
2008 deaths
Deaths from Alzheimer's disease
Knights Bachelor
Officers of the Order of the British Empire
Chief Constables of the Royal Ulster Constabulary
People from County Antrim
Northern Irish recipients of the Queen's Police Medal
Deaths from dementia in Northern Ireland